James Earnest Vivieaere (1947 – 3 June 2011), a New Zealand artist of Cook Island Maori heritage, was born in Waipawa, Hawke’s Bay, New Zealand. He was a well-respected and significant multimedia and installation artist, freelance curator and a passionate advocate for contemporary Pacific art.

Early life
Vivieaere was raised in the Hawke's Bay by adoptive parents. His contact with his Rarotongan heritage came later in life; in 1982 he was awarded a scholarship to study tapa in Rarotonga and located his father on that trip.

Education
High academic achievement saw Vivieaere enrol in Dunedin medical school in the late 1960s. He found it difficult to fit into the ‘white upper middle class confines of med school’ and dropped out to enrol at The University of Canterbury School of Fine Arts where he studied graphic design from 1971 to 1974.

Career as a curator
Vivieaere worked to profile contemporary Pacific artists to the world. He curated the formative contemporary Pacific arts survey exhibition  Bottled Ocean: Contemporary Polynesian Artistswhich launched at Wellington City Art Gallery  in 1994 and toured New Zealand throughout 1994–1995. “Bottled Ocean was the first survey of contemporary New Zealand Polynesian art and 'featured many now iconic Pacific artists including Fatu Feu’u, Johnny Penisula, John Pule, Lily Laita, John Ioane, Niki Hastings-McFall, Albert Refiti, Filipe Tohi, Michel Tuffery, Ani O'Neill, Loretta Young, Patrick Futialo (aka hip hop artist Tha Feelstyle Orator).'

In 2006 he was awarded the Senior Pacific Artist Award at the Creative New Zealand Arts Pasifka Awards.

Exhibitions as a curator:

1993Southern Response to Northern Possession, Uberseemuseum, Bremen, Germany.
1994-95Bottled Ocean: Contemporary Polynesian Artist, Wellington City Art Galler] and touring
1995Asa No Hikari, New Sign, Masano and Minori Kawan, Artspace, Auckland, New Zealand.
1996Asia-Pacific Triennial of Contemporary Ar, Queensland Art Gallery, Brisbane. 
2009 The Great Journey: In Pursuit of the Ancestral Real, Kaohsiung Museum, Taiwan.

Exhibition list
 
1979 Documents, Little Maidment Theatre, Auckland
1980 Willis Street Art Centre, Wellington
1980 Hawkes Bay Art Gallery, Napier
1981 5 Hour Exhibition, DB Waitemata Tavern, Auckland
1981 3 Hour Exhibition, Club XS, Airdale Street, Auckland
1982 Works of Art for Sale, Outreach Gallery, Auckland
1982 Women’s Federation Rooms
1982 Avarua Rarotanga
1983 Jim Vivieaere’s Art, RKS Gallery, Auckland
1983 2 ½ Hour Exhibition, Last & First Café, Auckland

References

1947 births
2011 deaths
New Zealand artists
New Zealand curators
Cook Island Māori people
People from Waipawa